Bauera microphylla is a species of flowering plant in the family Cunoniaceae and is endemic to New South Wales. It is a small shrub with trifoliate, sometimes toothed leaves, and usually white, pedicellate flowers.

Description
Flowering occurs in spring and summer.

Taxonomy
Bauera microphylla was first formally described in 1830 by David Don in the Edinburgh New Philosophical Journal, from specimens collected by George Caley. The specific epithet (microphylla) means "small leaves".

Distribution and habitat
This species of Bauera mostly grows in near-coastal heath north from Wollongong in New South Wales.

References

Flora of New South Wales
Cunoniaceae
Oxalidales of Australia
Taxa named by David Don
Plants described in 1830